Promyri is a village in Magnesia, Greece. The stone-built village of Promyri clings to the steep hillsides of a long valley reaching the sea at Katigiorgis. The main road bypasses the village so it is quiet and free from traffic. The narrow streets are made of cobblestone and are surrounded by trees providing shade from the sun. The island of Skiathos can be seen from the centre of the village. The old houses are built from stone and date from the late 19th century. Others were built at the turn of the 20th century in a neoclassical style and are linked by stone footpaths between gardens filled with flowers. Promyri has traditional grocery shops, a bakery with wood fired ovens and butchers. There is now a modern supermarket and the main square is shaded by a vast plane tree flanked by a couple of tavernas. At one time, the village had many silk weavers but as the trade diminished, this was replaced by agriculture.

Populated places in Pelion